This is a list of player transfers involving Top 14 teams before or during the 2016–17 season. The list is of deals that are confirmed and are either from or to a rugby union team in the Top 14 during the 2015–16 season. It is not unknown for confirmed deals to be cancelled at a later date. Agen and Oyonnax were relegated to the Pro D2 for the 2016–17 season replaced by Lyon and Bayonne.

Bayonne

Players In
 Evrard Dion Oulai from  US Carcassonne
 Ben Broster from  Biarritz Olympique
 Emmanuel Saubusse from  Mont-de-Marsan
 Manu Leiataua from  Aurillac
 Raphaël Lagarde from  Albi
 Jérôme Schuster from  Tarbes
 Adam Jaulhac from  Bordeaux Begles
 Jean-Blaise Lespinasse from  Bordeaux Begles
 Felix Le Bourhis from  Bordeaux Begles
 Tom Donnelly from  Montpellier
 Johnnie Beattie from  Castres Olympique
 Tanerau Latimer from  Blues
 Davit Khinchagishvili from  Racing 92
 Lorenzo Cittadini from  Wasps

Players Out
 Pierre Sayerse to  US Montauban
 Simon Courcoul to  RC Narbonne

Bordeaux

Players In
 Julien Audy from  La Rochelle
 Ian Madigan from  Leinster
 Vadim Cobilas from  Sale Sharks
 Luke Jones from  Melbourne Rebels
 Marc Clerc from  Oyonnax
 Geoffrey Cros from  Tarbes
 Johan Aliouat from  US Carcassonne
 Josaia Vakacegu from  Béziers
 Kobus van Wyk from 
 Tom Palmer from  Benetton Treviso

Players Out
 Francisco Gomez Kodela to  Lyon
 Julien Le Devedec to  CA Brive
 Sofiane Guitoune to  Toulouse
 Xerom Civil to  Albi
 Lucas Blanc to  Albi
 Patrick Toetu to  CA Brive
 Heini Adams retired
 Matthew Clarkin retired
 Charles Brousse to  Provence
 Sekope Kepu to  NSW Waratahs
 Pierre Bernard to  Toulon
 Adam Jaulhac to  Bayonne
 Jean-Blaise Lespinasse to  Bayonne
 Felix Le Bourhis to  Bayonne

Brive

Players In
 Julien Le Devedec from  Bordeaux Begles
 Vasil Lobzhanidze from  RC Armazi Tbilisi
 Patrick Toetu from  Bordeaux Begles
 Soso Bekoshvili from  Chambéry
 Benjamin Lapeyre from  La Rochelle
 Seremaia Burotu from  Biarritz Olympique
 Vivien Devisme from  Soyaux Angoulême

Players Out
 Anderson Neisen to  Limoges
 Yusuf Tuncer to  Albi
 Hugues Briatte to  Nevers
 Victor Lebas to  Soyaux Angoulême
 Goderdzi Shvelidze retired
 Anton Peikrishvili to  Ulster

Castres

Players In
 Loic Jacquet from  Clermont Auvergne
 Daniel Kotze from  Clermont Auvergne
 Jody Jenneker from  Oyonnax
 Damien Tussac from  US Montauban
 Tudor Stroe from  Tarbes
 Afusipa Taumoepeau from  Albi
 Robert Ebersohn from  Montpellier
 Maama Vaipulu from  Chiefs
 Steve Mafi from  Western Force
 Horacio Agulla from  Bath Rugby
 Pierre Berard from  Montpellier
 Maxime Javaux from  Racing 92
 Thibault Lasselle from  Toulon

Players Out
 Richie Gray to  Toulouse
 Remi Lamerat to  Clermont Auvergne
 Piula Faʻasalele to  Toulouse
 Vlad Nistor to  Albi
 Karena Wihongi to  Lyon
 Benjamin Desroches to  Albi
 Rudi Wulf to  Lyon
 Ibrahim Diarra to  Pau
 Johnnie Beattie to  Bayonne
 Daniel Kirkpatrick to  Albi
 Mathieu Bonello retired
 Yannick Forestier retired
 Romain Cabannes retired
 Sitiveni Sivivatu retired

Clermont

Players In
 Sitaleki Timani from  Montpellier
 Remi Lamerat from  Castres Olympique
 Isaia Toeava from  Kubota Spears
 Aaron Jarvis from  Ospreys

Players Out
 Jonathan Davies to  Scarlets
 Brock James to  La Rochelle
 Loic Jacquet to  Castres Olympique
 Daniel Kotze to  Castres Olympique
 Jamie Cudmore to  Oyonnax
 Pellow van der Westhuizen to  US Montauban

Grenoble

Players In
 David Mélé from  Toulouse
 Sisa Waqa from  Canberra Raiders
 Aly Muldowney from  Connacht

Players Out
 Jackson Willison to  Worcester Warriors
 Robinson Caire to  Biarritz Olympique
 Daniel Kilioni to  US Carcassonne
 Kevin Goze to  Bourgoin

La Rochelle

Players In
 Vincent Rattez from  RC Narbonne
 Brock James from  Clermont Auvergne
 Alexis Balès from  Agen
 Victor Vito from  Hurricanes
 Dany Priso from  Stade Francais
 Jérémie Maurouard from  Oyonnax
 Mohamed Boughanmi from  Toulon
 Steeve Barry from  France Sevens
 Arthur Retière from  Racing 92
 Paul Jordaan from  Sharks

Players Out
 Julien Audy to  Bordeaux Begles
 David Roumieu to  Biarritz Olympique
 Thomas Synaeghel to  Biarritz Olympique
 Fabien Fortassin to  Biarritz Olympique
 Benjamin Lapeyre to  CA Brive
 Gagi Bazadze to  Montpellier
 Malietoa Hingano to  Honda Heat
 Benjamin Geledan to  Oyonnax
 Francois Herry to  Nevers
 Alipate Ratini to  Stade Francais
 Alofa Alofa to  Harlequins

Lyon

Players In
 Alexandre Menini from  Toulon
 Francisco Gomez Kodela from  Bordeaux Begles
 Karena Wihongi from  Castres Olympique
 Stéphane Clément from  Biarritz Olympique
 Mickaël Ivaldi from  Montpellier
 Maselino Paulino from  Scarlets
 Josh Bekhuis from  Blues
 Franco Mostert from  Lions
 Félix Lambey from  Béziers
 Virgile Bruni from  Toulon
 Frédéric Michalak from  Toulon
 Mike Harris from  Melbourne Rebels
 Théo Belan from  Toulon
 Delon Armitage from  Toulon
 Rudi Wulf from  Castres Olympique
 Curtis Browning from  Queensland Reds
 BJ Botha from  Munster

Players Out
 Karim Kouider to  Béziers
 Waisale Sukanaveita to  US Montauban
 Steevy Cerqueira to  Béziers
 Didier Tison to  RC Narbonne
 Hoani Tui to  Oyonnax
 Jean Baptiste Singer to  Biarritz Olympique
 Damien Fitzpatrick to  NSW Waratahs
 Wian du Preez retired
 Eugene N'Zi to  Nevers
 Jérémy Gondrand to  Oyonnax
 Jean-Philippe Bonrepaux retired
 Karim Ghezal retired
 Kendrick Lynn retired

Montpellier

Players In
 Alexandre Dumoulin from  Racing 92
 Nemani Nadolo from  Crusaders
 Konstantin Mikautadze from  Toulon
 Gagi Bazadze from  La Rochelle
 Grégory Fichten from  RC Narbonne
 Antoine Guillamon from  Oyonnax
 Joffrey Michel from  USA Perpignan
 Vincent Martin from  Oyonnax
 Ben Botica from  Harlequins
 Henry Immelman from  Free State Cheetahs
 Nico Janse van Rensburg from  Bulls
 Joe Tomane from  Brumbies
 Shalva Mamukashvili from  Glasgow Warriors
 Romain Ruffenach from  Biarritz Olympique

Players Out
 Sitaleki Timani to  Clermont Auvergne
 Mickael Ivaldi to  Lyon
 François Trinh-Duc to  Toulon
 Nicolas Mas retired
 Ilian Perraux to  Albi
 Pat Cilliers to  Leicester Tigers
 Ben Mowen to  Pau
 Robert Ebersohn to  Castres Olympique
 Martin Devergie to  US Colomiers
 Oleg Ishchenko to  US Colomiers
 Tom Donnelly to  Bayonne
 Pierre Berard to  Castres Olympique
 Thibaut Privat to  Lyon
 Anthony Tuitavake to  Racing 92
 Anthony Floch retired

Pau

Players In
 Masalosalo Tutaia from  Mont-de-Marsan
 Ben Mowen from  Montpellier
 Julien Tomas from  Stade Francais
 Ibrahim Diarra from  Castres Olympique
 Fabrice Metz from  Oyonnax
 Pierrick Gunther from  Oyonnax
 Malik Hamadache from  Albi
 Steffon Armitage from  Toulon
 Tom Taylor from  Toulon
 Jamie Mackintosh from  Ohio Aviators

Players Out
 Mathieu Acebes to  USA Perpignan
 Samuel Marques to  Toulouse
 Giorgi Natsarashvili to  US Carcassonne
 Elijah Niko to  Béziers
 Josefa Domolailai to  US Carcassonne
 Vincent Campo retired
 Jean Bouilhou retired
 Damien Traille retired
 Baptiste Bonnet retired
 Sireli Bobo to  RC Strasbourg
 Marika Vunibaka Jr released

Racing

Players In
 Leone Nakarawa from  Glasgow Warriors
 Viliamu Afatia from  Agen
 Anthony Tuitavake from Montpellier
 Ali Williams unattached
 Gerbrandt Grobler unattached

Players Out
 Alexandre Dumoulin to  Montpellier
 Luke Charteris to  Bath Rugby
 Arthur Retière to  La Rochelle
 Luc Barba to  Oyonnax
 Mike Phillips to  Sale Sharks
 Maxime Javaux to  Castres Olympique
 Juandré Kruger to  Toulon
 Davit Khinchagishvili to  Bayonne
 Johan Goosen retired
 Martin Castrogiovanni retired

Stade Français

Players In
 Alipate Ratini from  La Rochelle

Players Out
 Dany Priso to  La Rochelle
 Julien Tomas to  Pau

Toulon

Players In
 François Trinh-Duc from  Montpellier
 Liam Gill from  Queensland Reds
 Marcel van der Merwe from  Bulls
 Laurent Delboubes from  Oyonnax
 Vincent Clerc from  Toulouse
 Pierre Bernard from  Bordeaux Begles
 Ayumu Goromaru from  Queensland Reds
 Aidon Davis from  Southern Kings
 Juandré Kruger from  Racing 92

Players Out
 Theo Belan to  Lyon 
 Konstantin Mikautadze to  Montpellier
 Paul O'Connell retired
 Lachlan Turner to  Exeter Chiefs
 Alexandre Menini to  Lyon
 Virgile Bruni to  Lyon
 Delon Armitage to  Lyon
 Mohamed Boughanmi to  La Rochelle
 UJ Seuteni to  Oyonnax
 Frédéric Michalak to  Lyon
 Steffon Armitage to  Pau
 Thibault Lasselle to  Castres Olympique
 Tom Taylor to  Pau
 Quade Cooper to  Queensland Reds

Toulouse

Players In
 Richie Gray from  Castres Olympique
 Sofiane Guitoune from  Bordeaux Begles
 Leonardo Ghiraldini from  Leicester Tigers
 Piula Faʻasalele from  Castres Olympique
 Samuel Marques from  Pau
 Maks van Dyk from  Cheetahs

Players Out
 Louis Picamoles to  Northampton Saints
 David Mélé to  Grenoble
 Corey Flynn to  Glasgow Warriors
 Romain Millo-Chluski to  USA Perpignan
 Thomas Ramos to  US Colomiers
 Clément Poitrenaud to 
 Imanol Harinordoquy retired
 Vincent Clerc to  Toulon
 Timoci Matanavou to  USA Perpignan

See also
 List of 2016–17 Premiership Rugby transfers
 List of 2016–17 Pro12 transfers
 List of 2016–17 RFU Championship transfers
 List of 2016–17 Super Rugby transfers

References

2016-17
2016–17 Top 14 season